The 2017 Hockey India League, known as Coal India Hockey India League for sponsorship reasons, was the fifth season of the Hockey India League. It was held between 21 January and 26 February 2017. Kalinga Lancers beat Dabang Mumbai 4–1 in the final to win their first title. Six teams played 34 matches in six venues with final played in Sector 42 Stadium, Chandigarh. The prize money was announced to be 3 crores INR.

Punjab Warriors were the defending champions and were eliminated in the round-robin stage. Uttar Pradesh Wizards finished third, beating Delhi Waveriders in the third place playoff. Kalinga Lancers' Glenn Turner and Moritz Fürste finished as the tournament's joint top-scorers with 12 goals each. Dabang Mumbai's Florian Fuchs was named the Player of the Tournament.

Teams

Six teams competed in the season, the same from last season.

Format
Six teams were placed in a group to play home-away round robin matches. The top four teams qualified for the knockout stage. This season again featured some rules regarding scoring goals as every field goal was double compared to goals scored from penalty corners, meaning a field goal counted as two while successfully converted short corners were considered one goal. Playing eleven, teams had to have a minimum of two and a maximum of five foreign players.

Standings

(Q) Qualified for semi-finals; (E) Eliminated.

Results table

First to fourth place classification

Semi-finals

Third and fourth place

Final

Statistics

Leading goalscorers

Awards

References

External links

  
Hockey India League seasons
India
Hockey